Jason Jackson (born October 30, 1990) is a Jamaican mixed martial artist who competes in the welterweight division of Bellator MMA. A professional since 2012, Jackson has competed in Titan FC, and, Legacy Fighting Alliance. He also appeared on the UFC's reality television series The Ultimate Fighter: American Top Team vs. Blackzilians.

As of October 2022 he is #10 in Fight Matrix's welterweight rankings. As of October 4, 2022 he is #3 in the Bellator Welterweight Rankings.

Background 
Jackson was born in Spanish Town, Jamaica on October 30, 1990. At the age of 12 he moved to South Florida, graduating from Miramar High School, where he competed on the school’s wrestling team. Growing up he was a fan of professional wrestling and the WWE. He began training for mixed martial arts at the age of 19 with The Blackzilians.

Mixed martial arts career

Early career
Jackson made his professional debut in 2012, compiling a record of 5-2 in regional promotions, where he competed against future UFC fighters, Colby Covington, and Michael Johnson.

The Ultimate Fighter
In February 2015, it was announced Jackson would be a contestant on The Ultimate Fighter: American Top Team vs. Blackzilians.

Jackson's first fight on TUF was against Marcelo Alfaya, whom he defeated by majority decision.

In his second fight on the show he faced future Titan FC Welterweight Champion Michael Graves. Early in the first round Jackson connected with a groin kick that went unnoticed by the referee and almost finished Graves with punches. However Graves survived and submitted Jackson with a rear naked choke in round one, eliminating him from the tournament.

Titan Fighting Championships
Jackson made his Titan FC debut against Rodrigo Cavalheiro Correia on September 9, 2016 at Titan FC 41. He won the fight via unanimous decision.

Jackson then competed in a title match against Titan FC Welterweight Champion and future UFC fighter, Dhiego Lima on December 2, 2016 at Titan FC 42. Jackson won the fight via technical knockout early in round one, claiming the Titan FC Welterweight Championship.

Jackson vacated his title after being invited to compete on Dana White's Contender Series. He faced Kyle Stewart, and lost the fight via TKO in round two after suffering an ankle injury that rendered him unable to continue. He was not awarded a UFC contract as a result.

Bellator MMA

Jackson made his Bellator MMA debut against Jordon Larson on August 17, 2018 at Bellator 204. He won the fight via TKO in round one.

After picking up two wins in the Legacy Fighting Alliance promotion, Jackson returned to Bellator, facing Ed Ruth on October 25, 2019 at Bellator 231. He lost the fight via controversial split decision. 4 out of 6 media outlets scored the fight for Jackson.

Jackson faced Kiichi Kunimoto on December 21, 2019 at Bellator 236. He won the fight via unanimous decision.

Jackson then faced promotional newcomer Jordan Mein on July 24, 2020 at Bellator 242. He won the fight via unanimous decision.

Jackson then faced former UFC Lightweight Champion and former Bellator Lightweight Championship contender, Benson Henderson on November 28, 2020 at Bellator 253. Jackson controlled a majority of the fight, winning via unanimous decision in an upset victory.

Jackson next faced Neiman Gracie on April 2, 2021 at Bellator 255. He won the close fight via unanimous decision.

Jackson faced Paul Daley on June 11, 2021 at Bellator 260. Jackson used his wrestling to dominate Daley, winning the fight via unanimous decision.

Jackson was scheduled to face former Bellator Welterweight Champion Douglas Lima on May 13, 2022 at Bellator London. However the fight was postponed to July 24, 2022 at Bellator 283 for undisclosed reasons. At the weigh-ins, Douglas Lima, came in at 172.8 lbs, 1.8 pounds heavy for his headlining welterweight bout. The bout proceeded at a catchweight and Lima was fined a percentage of his individual purse, which went to Jackson. Jackson won the fight via unanimous decision.

Personal life 
Jackson is married to his wife Yanisuka. They have 2 children and 2 stepchildren.

Jackson is a fan of WWE, with his nickname "The Ass-Kicking Machine" being inspired from an angle between The Rock, Kane, and Hulk Hogan.

Championships and accomplishments 
Titan Fighting Championship
Titan FC Welterweight Championship (One time)
Legacy Fighting Alliance
LFA Welterweight Championship(One time)
Victory Fighting Championships
VFC Welterweight Championship (One time) (One time)

Mixed martial arts record

|-
|Win
|align=center|16–4
|Douglas Lima
|Decision (unanimous)
|Bellator 283
|
|align=center|5
|align=center|5:00
|Tacoma, Washington, United States
|
|-
| Win
| align=center|15–4
| Paul Daley
|Decision (unanimous)
|Bellator 260
|
|align=center|3
|align=center|5:00
|Uncasville, Connecticut, United States
|
|-
| Win
| align=center| 14–4
| Neiman Gracie
|Decision (unanimous)
|Bellator 255
|
|align=center|3
|align=center|5:00
|Uncasville, Connecticut, United States
| 
|-
| Win
| align=center| 13–4
| Benson Henderson
|Decision (unanimous)
|Bellator 253
|
|align=center|3
|align=center|5:00
|Uncasville, Connecticut, United States
| 
|-
| Win
| align=center|12–4
| Jordan Mein
|Decision (unanimous)
|Bellator 242 
|
|align=center|3
|align=center|5:00
|Uncasville, Connecticut, United States
|
|-
| Win
| align=center| 11–4
| Kiichi Kunimoto
| Decision (unanimous)
| Bellator 236
| 
| align=center|3
| align=center|5:00
| Honolulu, Hawaii, United States
| 
|-
| Loss
| align=center| 10–4
| Ed Ruth
|Decision (split)
|Bellator 231
|
|align=center| 3
|align=center| 5:00
|Uncasville, Connecticut, United States
| 
|-
| Win
| align=center| 10–3
| Hemerson Souza
| Decision (split)
|LFA 71
|
|align=center|5
|align=center|5:00
|Atlanta, Georgia, United States
|
|-
| Win
| align=center| 9–3
| Scott Futrell
| Submission (arm-triangle choke)
|LFA 64
|
|align=center|2
|align=center|4:07
|Sioux Falls, South Dakota, United States
| 
|-
| Win
| align=center| 8–3
| Jordon Larson
|TKO (punches)
|Bellator 204
|
| align=center| 1
| align=center| 3:52
|Sioux Falls, South Dakota, United States
| 
|-
| Loss
| align=center| 7–3
|Kyle Stewart
| TKO (ankle injury)
|Dana White's Contender Series 3
|
|align=center|2
|align=center|0:21
|Las Vegas, Nevada, United States
| 
|-
| Win
| align=center|7–2
| Dhiego Lima
| TKO (punches)
| Titan FC 42
| 
| align=center| 1
| align=center| 2:10
| Coral Gables, Florida, United States
| 
|-
| Win
| align=center|6–2
| Rodrigo Cavalheiro
| Decision (unanimous)
| Titan FC 41
| 
| align=center|3
| align=center|5:00
| Coral Gables, Florida, United States
|
|-
| Win
| align=center| 5–2
| Victor Moreno
| TKO (punches)
| Victory Fighting Championship 48
| 
| align=center| 1
| align=center| 1:55
| Urbandale, Iowa, United States
| 
|-
| Win
| align=center| 4–2
| Michael Lilly
| Decision (unanimous)
| Fight Time 20
|
|align=Center|3
|align=center|5:00
|Fort Lauderdale, Florida, United States
| 
|-
| Loss
| align=center| 3–2
| Hayder Hassan
|TKO (punches)
|CFA 12
|
|align=center|3
|align=center|2:32
|Miami, Florida, United States
|
|-
| Win
| align=center| 3–1
| Michael Johnson
| Submission (triangle choke)
|Fight Time 12: Warriors Collide
|
|align=center|2
|align=center|2:05
|Fort Lauderdale, Florida, United States
| 
|-
| Win
| align=center| 2–1
| Efrain Cintron
| Submission (triangle choke)
| Fight Time 11: Unfinished Business
| 
| align=center| 2
| align=center| 1:10
| Fort Lauderdale, Florida, United States
| 
|-
| Loss
| align=center| 1–1
| Colby Covington
|Decision (unanimous)
|Fight Time 10: It's Personal
|
|align=center|3
|align=center|5:00
|Fort Lauderdale, Florida, United States
|
|-
| Win
| align=center| 1–0
| Jerome Buchanan
| TKO (punches)
| Fight Time 9: MMA Explosion
| 
| align=center| 1
| align=center| 0:55
| Fort Lauderdale, Florida, United States
|

See also 
 List of current Bellator fighters
 List of male mixed martial artists

References

External links 
  
 

1990 births
Living people
Jamaican male mixed martial artists
Welterweight mixed martial artists
Mixed martial artists utilizing wrestling 
Bellator male fighters